Tayloria lingulata, commonly known as  lingulate dung moss, tongue-leaved gland-moss,  or marsh collar-moss, is a moss found in montane habitats in the Northern Hemisphere including Europe, Asia and North America.

In the United Kingdom, it occurs only in Scotland where it has been found on Ben Lawers and Ben Lomond.

See also
Endemic Scottish mosses:
 Bryoerythrophyllum caledonicum
 Bryum dixonii
 Pohlia scotica
Didymodon mamillosus
Plagiomnium medium
Flora of Scotland

References

Splachnales
Flora of Scotland